Glen Haven is an unincorporated census-designated place in the town of Glen Haven, Grant County, Wisconsin, United States. Glen Haven has a post office with ZIP code 53810. As of the 2010 census, its population is 73.

The town has a USPS post office, a Catholic Church, a bank outlet and two bars.

References

Census-designated places in Grant County, Wisconsin
Census-designated places in Wisconsin
Wisconsin populated places on the Mississippi River